

Hans-Jürgen Stumpff (15 June 1889 – 9 March 1968), was a German general during World War II and was one of the signatories to Germany's unconditional surrender at the end of the war.

Military career

Stumpff joined the army in 1907 and served on the General Staff during World War I. During the Weimar Republic, he served as a staff officer in the Reichswehrministerium. On 1 September 1933, Stumpff, with the rank of lieutenant colonel, became head of personnel in the (illegal) Luftwaffe. After the Luftwaffe became formally legal in Germany because of the Nazis rejection of the terms of the Treaty of Versailles, Stumpff served as its chief of staff from 1 June 1937 until 1 January 1939. In 1938, Stumpff was promoted to the rank of General der Flieger.

During the Second World War, Stumpff commanded various Luftflotten. On 19 July 1940, Stumpff was promoted to the rank of Generaloberst and awarded the Knight's Cross of the Iron Cross. Until the end of 1943 Stumpff commanded Luftflotte 5, with which he took part in the Battle of Britain, operating out of Norway against Scotland and Northern England. Stumpff was a recipient of the Knight's Cross of the Iron Cross of Nazi Germany.

In January 1944, Stumpff commanded Luftwaffe forces in the Defense of the Reich campaign against the Allied bombing attacks. On 8 May 1945, Stumpff served as the Luftwaffe representative at the signing of the unconditional surrender of Germany in Berlin. Stumpff was released from British captivity in 1947; he died in 1968.

Awards and decorations

 Knight's Cross of the Iron Cross on 18 September 1941 as Generaloberst and Chief of Luftflotte 5 and Befehlshaber Nord (commander-in-chief north)
 Grand Cross with Swords of the Order of the White Rose of Finland on 27 October 1941 as Generaloberst

References

Bibliography

 
 

1889 births
1968 deaths
People from Kołobrzeg
German Army personnel of World War I
Luftwaffe World War II generals
Recipients of the Knight's Cross of the Iron Cross
Recipients of the clasp to the Iron Cross, 1st class
Recipients of the Hanseatic Cross (Lübeck)
People from the Province of Pomerania
Prussian Army personnel
German prisoners of war in World War II held by the United Kingdom
Colonel generals of the Luftwaffe